Youngibelus is a genus of belemnite, an extinct group of cephalopods.

Sexual Dimorphism 
Y. tubularis and Y. levis are two species from Toarcian aged rocks in Yorkshire. It has been suggested that these two species are actually morphs of the same species. The divergence in morphology occurs in the gerontic stage of development, characterised by differences in the rostrum. In Y. levis, the rostrum thickens, whilst in Y. tubularis, an epirostrum develops. Peter Doyle proposed that the epirostrum developed as either a counterbalance for a sexual adaptation, or for display in courtship.

See also

 Belemnite
 List of belemnites

References

 
 
 

Belemnites
Jurassic cephalopods